Morris Park is a  neighborhood in the New York City borough of the Bronx. Its approximate boundaries, starting from the north and moving clockwise, are Neill Avenue and Pelham Parkway to the north, Eastchester Road to the East, the Amtrak Northeast Corridor tracks and Sackett Avenue to the east and south, and Bronxdale Avenue or White Plains Road to the west. It borders the neighborhoods of Van Nest to its southwest and Pelham Parkway to its northeast. Williamsbridge Road and Morris Park Avenue are the primary thoroughfares.

The neighborhood is part of Bronx Community District 11 in the East Bronx, and its ZIP Codes include 10461 and 10462. The area is patrolled by the 49th Precinct of the New York City Police Department, located at 2121 Eastchester Road. The local subway is the IRT Dyre Avenue Line, which runs under the Esplanade. The neighborhood has a large Albanian American and Italian American population.

History

Morris Park is named after John Albert Morris, who built the Morris Park Racecourse, which existed from 1889 until 1910. In 1890, the Morris Park Racecourse hosted both the Preakness and the Belmont Stakes; the latter continued to be run there until 1905. The track was later used for auto racing and was the site of the first public air show. After a 1910 fire, the property was divided into lots for the current neighborhood. Several streets in Morris Park, including Cruger, Holland, Radcliff, Colden, Paulding, and Hone Avenues, are named after mayors of New York City during the 18th and 19th centuries.

Land use and terrain
Housing in Morris Park is mostly one and two family homes of various styles. The neighborhood also has several apartment buildings. The total land area is a little over one-third of a square mile. The area is low-lying and relatively flat.

The northern section of Morris Park nearest Jacobi Medical Center is also referred to as Indian Village. Several streets are named after Native American tribes, including Choctaw Place, Narragansett Avenue, Seminole Avenue, and Pawnee Place.

Demographics
For census purposes, the New York City government classifies Morris Park as part of a larger neighborhood tabulation area called Van Nest/Morris Park/Westchester Square. Based on data from the 2010 United States Census, the population of Van Nest/Morris Park/Westchester Square was 29,250, a change of 2,115 (7.2%) from the 27,135 counted in 2000. The racial makeup of the neighborhood was 27.3% (7,987) White, 11.1% (3,245) African American, 0.3% (82) Native American, 10.6% (3,100) Asian, 0.1% (15) Pacific Islander, 1% (292) from other races, and 1.4% (410) from two or more races. Hispanic or Latino of any race were 48.3% (14,119) of the population.

The entirety of Community District 11, which comprises Morris Park and Allerton, had 116,180 inhabitants as of NYC Health's 2018 Community Health Profile, with an average life expectancy of 79.9 years. This is lower than the median life expectancy of 81.2 for all New York City neighborhoods. Most inhabitants are youth and middle-aged adults: 22% are between the ages of between 0–17, 30% between 25–44, and 24% between 45–64. The ratio of college-aged and elderly residents was lower, at 9% and 14% respectively.

As of 2017, the median household income in Community District 11 was $48,018. In 2018, an estimated 21% of Morris Park and Allerton residents lived in poverty, compared to 25% in all of the Bronx and 20% in all of New York City. One in eight residents (12%) were unemployed, compared to 13% in the Bronx and 9% in New York City. Rent burden, or the percentage of residents who have difficulty paying their rent, is 55% in Morris Park and Allerton, compared to the boroughwide and citywide rates of 58% and 51% respectively. Based on this calculation, Morris Park and Allerton are considered high-income relative to the rest of the city and not gentrifying.

Culture
The neighborhood has a large Italian population, and since the early 2000s, has also had a large Albanian population and smaller Asian and Hispanic neighborhoods. Morris Park has always been predominantly Italian  It is generally more suburban than other neighborhoods in the Bronx.

As an Italian American neighborhood, the residents have close ties to their heritage. After Italy’s World Cup victory in 2006, over 30,000 flocked to the neighborhood for an all-day party. Since then, Morris Park has gained a rival reputation with Arthur Avenue for the prototypical Italian-American neighborhood in the Bronx. Morris Park has one of the highest percentage of Italian populations in the city, along with Bensonhurst in Brooklyn and Staten Island.

Morris Park is famous for its annual Columbus Day parade, which began in 1977 to honor Christopher Columbus. It is held on the Sunday before the national Columbus Day holiday. Rudolph Giuliani, Michael Bloomberg, and Bill de Blasio have attended as mayors. The procession begins at the intersection of Morris Park Avenue and White Plains Road, marches east on Morris Park Avenue, turns north on Williamsbridge Road, and ends at Pelham Parkway South. The reviewing stand, where the local dignitaries, politicians, civic and business leaders, and Grand Marshal sit, is located on Williamsbridge Road between Lydig and Neill avenues. Past Grand Marshals have included actors Tony LoBianco, Chazz Palminteri, television personality Regis Philbin, and former New York Yankees first baseman Joe Pepitone.

Politics
Politically, Morris Park is in New York's 14th congressional district, represented by Democrat Alexandria Ocasio-Cortez . It is also part of the 34th State Senate district, represented by Democrat Alessandra Biaggi, and the 80th State Assembly district, represented by Democrat Nathalia Fernandez. Morris Park is located in New York's 13th City Council district, represented by Marjorie Velázquez, a Democrat.

A reflection of its heavily Italian-American and Catholic population, Morris Park was politically conservative and remained one of the Bronx's few solidly Republican neighborhoods until the 1990s. It was represented in the United States Congress from 1953 to 1969 by Paul Fino, a Republican, and then from 1969 to 1988 by Mario Biaggi, a socially conservative and law and order Democrat. Republican State Senators such as John D. Calandra and Guy Velella drew extensive support from Morris Park residents. In his three mayoral campaigns in 1989, 1993, and 1997, Rudy Giuliani, a Republican, carried Morris Park by substantial margins. In recent years, changing demographics have altered the neighborhood's political landscape.

Notable locations

The Albert Einstein College of Medicine, Jacobi Medical Center, and the Jack D. Weiler Hospital division of Montefiore Medical Center are located on the eastern edge of the neighborhood. The neighborhood is also home to Bronx Psychiatric Center and Calvary Hospital. St. Francis Xavier School and St. Clare of Assisi School are two local Catholic schools. Our Savior Lutheran School, P.S. 83, and P.S. 108 are other local schools.

Loreto Park, bounded by Morris Park, Haight, Van Nest, and Tomlinson Avenues, was named after Alfred Loreto, a police officer who lived nearby at 1870 Hering Avenue and was killed on July 21, 1950 while foiling an attempted kidnapping of his neighbor. It underwent a large renovation that was completed in 2012. Councilman James Vacca allocated $500,000 from the New York City Council for the reconstruction. Additions included a play area for toddlers, wheelchair accessible equipment, planting beds, new benches, fencing, and game tables. The bocce court was renovated, and a roller hockey rink was added. However, the Morris Park Hockey League folded several years later and the rink quickly became underutilized, leading to another major reconstruction project costing $2,000,000 that is scheduled for completion in September 2021.

Joseph Garofalo, a World War II veteran, persuaded John Dormi & Sons Funeral Home on Morris Park Avenue to display his collection of medals and war memorabilia and named it the Bronx Military Museum. People in the neighborhood have also contributed military memorabilia that belonged to their relatives.

Police and crime

Morris Park and Allerton are patrolled by the 49th Precinct of the New York City Police Department, located at 2121 Eastchester Road. The 49th Precinct ranked 43rd safest out of 69 patrol areas for per-capita crime in 2010. , with a non-fatal assault rate of 64 per 100,000 people, Morris Park and Allerton's rate of violent crimes per capita is slightly more than that of the city as a whole. The incarceration rate of 372 per 100,000 people is lower than that of the city as a whole.

The 49th Precinct has a lower crime rate than in the 1990s, with crimes across all categories having decreased by 71.7% between 1990 and 2022. The precinct reported 7 murders, 17 rapes, 273 robberies, 367 felony assaults, 133 burglaries, 611 grand larcenies, and 371 grand larcenies auto in 2022.

Fire safety

Morris Park is served by the New York City Fire Department's Squad 61/Battalion 20, located at 1518 Williamsbridge Road. Engine Company 97 is located just outside Morris Park at 1454 Astor Avenue. Also just off Morris Park Avenue is Engine 90/Ladder 41 located at 1843 White Plains Road. In addition, the Fire Department's Emergency Medical Service's Station 20 is located on the grounds of Jacobi Medical Center.

Health
, preterm births and births to teenage mothers are slightly more common in Morris Park and Allerton than in other places citywide. In Morris Park and Allerton, there were 90 preterm births per 1,000 live births (compared to 87 per 1,000 citywide), and 19.7 births to teenage mothers per 1,000 live births (compared to 19.3 per 1,000 citywide). Morris Park and Allerton has a low population of residents who are uninsured. In 2018, this population of uninsured residents was estimated to be 12%, the same as the citywide rate of 12%.

Fifteen percent of Morris Park and Allerton residents are smokers, which is slightly higher than the city average of 14% of residents being smokers. In Morris Park and Allerton, 32% of residents are obese, 14% are diabetic, and 31% have high blood pressure—compared to the citywide averages of 24%, 11%, and 28% respectively. In addition, 23% of children are obese, compared to the citywide average of 20%.

Eighty-three percent of residents eat some fruits and vegetables every day, which is lower than the city's average of 87%. In 2018, 80% of residents described their health as "good," "very good," or "excellent," slightly higher than the city's average of 78%. For every supermarket in Morris Park and Allerton, there are 17 bodegas.

The nearest large hospitals are Calvary Hospital, Montefiore Medical Center's Jack D. Weiler Hospital, and Jacobi Hospital. The Albert Einstein College of Medicine campus is also located in Morris Park.

Post office and ZIP Codes
Morris Park is located within ZIP Codes 10461 east of Paulding Avenue and 10462 west of Paulding Avenue. The United States Postal Service operates the Morris Park Station post office at 1807 Williamsbridge Road.

Education 

Morris Park and Allerton generally have a lower rate of college-educated residents than the rest of the city . While 32% of residents age 25 and older have a college education or higher, 24% have less than a high school education and 44% are high school graduates or have some college education. By contrast, 26% of Bronx residents and 43% of city residents have a college education or higher. The percentage of Morris Park and Allerton students excelling in math rose from 32% in 2000 to 48% in 2011, though reading achievement remained constant at 37% during the same time period.

Morris Park and Allerton's rate of elementary school student absenteeism is slightly higher than the rest of New York City. In Morris Park and Allerton, 23% of elementary school students missed twenty or more days per school year, a little more than the citywide average of 20%. Additionally, 74% of high school students in Morris Park and Allerton graduate on time, about the same as the citywide average of 75%.

Schools
The New York City Department of Education operates the following public schools in Morris Park:
 P.S. 83 Donald Hertz (grades K-8)
 P.S. 105 Senator Abraham Bernstein (grades PK-5)
 P.S. 108 Philip J Abinanti (grades PK-5)
 P.S./M.S. 498 Van Nest Academy (grades K-8)
 Bronx High School for the Visual Arts (grades 9-12)

Library

The New York Public Library's Morris Park branch is located at 985 Morris Park Avenue. The two-story,  branch opened in 2006. It is the first branch library to be built in Morris Park, and one of the newest locations in the system.

Transportation
The following MTA Regional Bus Operations bus routes serve Morris Park:
 bus to either the 225th Street station or Locust Point
 bus and Bx12 Select Bus Service to either the Bay Plaza Shopping Center or the Inwood–207th Street station
 bus to either the Westchester Square or Third Avenue–138th Street stations
 bus to either Woodlawn or the Westchester Square station
 express bus to and from Midtown Manhattan

Morris Park is also served by the following Bee-Line Bus System routes to Westchester County, New York:
BL60: to White Plains
BL61: to Port Chester
BL62: to White Plains

Subway service is provided by the New York City Subway via the following IRT Dyre Avenue Line stations, served by the :
Pelham Parkway/Esplanade
 Morris Park

Notable residents 
 Cara Buono (born 1973/1974), actress
 Mary Higgins Clark (1927–2020), best-selling mystery author
 Abel Ferrara (born 1951), film director
 Jeffrey D. Klein (born 1960), former New York State Senator (Democrat)  
 Jake LaMotta (1922–2017), former professional boxer and middleweight champion
 James Madio (born 1975), actor
 Ronnie Ortiz-Magro (born 1985), cast member of Jersey Shore
 Regis Philbin (1931–2020), television presenter, talk show host and game show host
 Luis Resto (born 1955), former welterweight boxer and subject of HBO documentary "Assault in the Ring"
 Anthony Ribustello, actor
 Nancy Savoca (born 1959), film director
 Andrew Velazquez (born 1994), MLB infielder. He played for the New York Yankees in 2021.
 Guy Velella (1944–2011), former New York State Senator (Republican) and Bronx Republican Chairman

In film
The Seven-Ups (1973)
The Wanderers (1979)
Raging Bull (1980)
True Love (1989)
Bad Lieutenant (1991)
Kiss Me Guido (1997)
Summer of Sam (1999)
Men in Black 3 (2012)

References

Further reading
 DiBrino, Nicholas. The History of the Morris Park Racecourse and the Morris Family (1977)

 
Albanian-American culture in New York City
Neighborhoods in the Bronx
Little Italys in the United States
1910 establishments in New York City